The 100th Regiment of Foot, or the Loyal Lincolnshire Regiment, was an infantry regiment of the British Army, formed in 1780 and disbanded in 1785. The Loyal Lincolnshire Regiment was reformed in 1794 as the 123rd Regiment of Foot (Loyal Lincolnshire) and was again disbanded in 1796.

History
The regiment was raised in Ireland by Colonel Thomas Humberstone, with Lieutenant-General Thomas Bruce assuming the colonelcy in August 1780. It was dispatched to India shortly after being raised, and fought in the Second Anglo-Mysore War; after surrendering at the Siege of Bednore on 28 April 1783, it was interned before returning to Ireland in 1784. It was disbanded in Ireland in 1785.

The "Loyal Lincolnshire" title was later reused by the 123rd Foot, raised in 1794 and disbanded in 1796.

Colonels 
Colonels of the regiment were as follows:
1780 Col. Thomas Frederick Mackenzie Humberston [also 72nd Hldrs]
1780.08.05 Lt-Gen. Hon. Thomas Bruce [to 1785; also 16th Foot]

(As 123rd)
1794 Edward Letherland [to 1795]

References 

Infantry regiments of the British Army
Military units and formations established in 1780
Military units and formations disestablished in 1785
1780 establishments in Great Britain
1785 disestablishments in Great Britain